Rolonda is a syndicated daytime talk show that aired from January 17, 1994, to May 18, 1997. It featured Rolonda Watts as the host, was produced by Watts Works Productions in association with King World Productions, and was also distributed by King World.

Background
The program served as a replacement in the majority of the markets carrying the show at launch for The Les Brown Show, a daytime talk show that debuted on September 6, 1993, and which went on hiatus in December 1993 due to low ratings, ending its run on January 14, 1994, the Friday before Rolonda's debut. Prior to hosting the show, Watts served as a senior correspondent and weekend anchor for the syndicated daytime newsmagazine series Inside Edition, which was also produced by King World.

References

1994 American television series debuts
1997 American television series endings
1990s American television talk shows
English-language television shows
First-run syndicated television programs in the United States
Television series by King World Productions